Pycnanthemum californicum is a species of flowering plant in the mint family known by the common name Sierra mint, mountain mint, and California mint.

Distribution
The plant is endemic to California, where it is native to the Sierra Nevada,  Peninsular Ranges, Eastern Transverse Ranges, and Inner Northern California Coast Ranges.

Description
Pycnanthemum californicum is a perennial herb growing erect  in height. It has hairless to fuzzy, aromatic herbage. The oppositely arranged leaves are lance-shaped to nearly oval, each a few centimeters long.

The inflorescences are located in clusters about the stem just above each upper pair of leaves. Each flower has a whitish upper lip and a purplish lower lip, sometimes with spots. The bloom period is June through September.

References

External links
Calflora Database: Pycnanthemum californicum (Mountain mint, Sierra mint, California mint)
Jepson Manual eFlora (TJM2) treatment of Pycnanthemum californicum
USDA Plants Profile for  Pycnanthemum californicum (Sierra mint)
UC Photos gallery of Pycnanthemum californicum (Sierra mint, Mountain mint)

californicum
Endemic flora of California
Flora of the Sierra Nevada (United States)
Natural history of the California chaparral and woodlands
Natural history of the California Coast Ranges
Natural history of the Peninsular Ranges
Natural history of the Transverse Ranges
Plants described in 1855
Taxa named by John Torrey
Flora without expected TNC conservation status